The Alberche is a river in the provinces of Ávila, Madrid and Toledo, central Spain. It begins its course at 1,800 m in Fuente Alberche, San Martín de la Vega del Alberche municipal term, Ávila Province. It forms the natural division between the Sierra de Gredos and the Sierra de Guadarrama, in the Sistema Central.

The Alberche flows roughly from NW to SE and bends sharply midway in its course to flow from NE to SW. It meets the Tagus a few kilometres east of Talavera de la Reina. This river has the following dams along its course: Burguillo, Charco del Cura, San Juan, Picadas and Cazalegas. Alberche Beach is a sandy beach stretch on the banks of the Alberche River, a favorite spot for vacationers from Madrid.

Tributaries
 Gaznata
 Cofio
 Perales

See also 
 List of rivers of Spain

References

External links

Canoeing, kayaking and river descent in Avila, Spain
 Turismo del Alberche
 Turismo Etnológico
 Turismo,Hospedage
 Casas rurales en el Valle Iruelas
 Campamento Juvenil

 
Geography of the Province of Ávila
Tributaries of the Tagus
Geography of the Province of Toledo
Rivers of the Community of Madrid
Rivers of Castile and León
Rivers of Castilla–La Mancha
Rivers of Spain